The discography of American country music singer Marty Robbins consists of 52 studio albums, 13 compilation albums, and 100 singles. In his career, Robbins has charted 17 Number One singles on the Billboard Hot Country Songs charts, as well as 82 Top 40 singles.

Robbins' highest-charting album is 1959's Gunfighter Ballads and Trail Songs. It charted to #6 on the all-genre Billboard 200, and was also certified Platinum by the Recording Industry Association of America. The album's first single, "El Paso", become a hit on both the country and pop charts, charting to Number One on the Hot Country Songs as well as the Billboard Hot 100. While that was his only pop Number One, in 1957, "A White Sport Coat" charted to #2, and in 1961, "Don't Worry" charted to #3.

Since his death in 1982, four posthumous studio albums have been released, although they did not make an impact on the charts.

His final Top 10 single was "Honkytonk Man" in 1982, which is the title of the film Robbins had starred in. However, he died shortly before the release of the film.

Studio albums

1950s albums

1960s albums

1970s albums

1980s albums

Compilation albums

Reissue

A Lifetime of Song (1988)
Gunfighter Ballads And Trail Songs (1989)(1999)
American Originals (1990)
Rockin' Rollin' Robbins, vol. 1 (1990)
Rockin' Rollin' Robbins, vol. 2 (1990)
Hawaii's Calling Me (1990)
Musical Journey to Caribbean And Mexico (1990)
Country(1951-1958) (1990)
Rockin' Rollin' Robbins, vol. 3 (1991)
All-Time Greatest Hits (1991)
More Greatest Hits (1991)
All-Time Greatest Hits (1992)
Legendary Marty Robbins (1993)
Lost And Found (1994)
Song of Robbins (1995)
Super Hits (1995)
Under Western Skies (1995)
Country(1960-1966) (1995)
All American Country (1995)
Singin' the Hits (1995)
No. 1 Cowboy (1996)
Story of My Life (1996)
Best of Marty Robbins (1996)
Rock'n Roll Robbins (1996)
Marty After Midnight (1997)
The Drifter (1997)
16 Biggest Hits (1998)
What God Has Done (2001)
Live Classics (2001)
Just a Little Sentimental/Turn the Lights Down (2002)
Reflections (2004)
All Around Cowboy (2004)
Early Years (2004)
Love Songs (2004)
Pretty Words (2005)
Best of Marty Robbins (2006)
Sing Me Something Sentimental (2006)
Castle In the Sky (2006)
Knee Deep in the Blues (2007)
Rockin' Robbins (2007)
Country Music Legends (2007)
Grande Ole Opry (2007)
Legend Lives On (2008)
Mister Teardrop (2008)
Essential Gunfighter Ballads And More (2008)
Have I Told You Lately That I Love You?/I've Got a Woman's Love (2010)
Singing Gunfighter (2010)
I Walk Alone/It's a Sin (2010)
El Paso: Greatest Hits And Favorites (2010)
El Paso: Marty Robbins Story;1952-1960 (2012)
My Woman, My Woman, My Wife/Marty After Midnight (2012)
Rocks (2012)
Return to Me : Columbia Country Hits; 1959-1982 (2013)
Legends/Come Back to Me (2013)
El Paso City/Adios Amigo (2013)
101 Devil Woman: Best of Marty Robbins (2013)
Just a Little Sentimental/Devil Woman (2013)
By the Time I get to Phoenix/Tonight Carmen (2013)
Devil Woman: 30 Greatest Hits (2014)
Six Classic Albums Plus Bonus Tracks (2014)
20 the Century Drifter: MCA Years (2014)
Songs From a Gunfighter (2015)
Today/Don't Let Me Touch You (2016)
All Around Cowboy/Everything I Always Wanted (2016)
RFD/My Kind of Country (2016)
Marty Robbins (2016)
Devil Woman: Four Lps And Six Singles; 1961-1962 (2017)
Devil Woman/Portrait of Mary (2017)
Complete Recordings: 1952-1960 (2017)
Four Classic Albums (2018)
The Drifter/Saddle Tramp/What God Has Done/Christmas With Marty Robbins (2018)

Holiday albums

Singles

1952–1960

1961–1970

1971–1980

1981–1983

B-sides

References

External links
 
 Entries at 45cat.com

Country music discographies
Discographies of American artists